Eleothinus longulus is a species of longhorn beetles of the subfamily Lamiinae. It was described by Henry Walter Bates in 1881, and is known from Guatemala.

References

Beetles described in 1881
Acanthocinini